The 1952 Tampa Spartans football team represented the University of Tampa in the 1952 college football season. It was the Spartans' 16th season. The team was led by head coach Marcelino Huerta, in his first year, and played their home games at Phillips Field in Tampa, Florida.

After the resignation of Frank Sinkwich, on March 5, 1952, Marcelino Huerta was introduced as the Spartans' new head coach. Huerta had previously served as a line coach under Sinkwich for the 1950 and 1951 seasons after he graduated from the University of Florida.

Schedule

References

Tampa
Tampa Spartans football seasons
Cigar Bowl champion seasons
Tampa Spartans football